La Nuit du carrefour may refer to:

 Maigret at the Crossroads, 1931 novel by Georges Simenon
 Night at the Crossroads, 1932 film adaptation of the novel by Jean Renoir